State of mind may refer to:

Film and television
A State of Mind, a 2004 British documentary film directed by Daniel Gordon
State of Mind (film), or Three Christs, a 2017 American drama film
State of Mind (TV series), a 2007 American comedy-drama series
State of Mind, a 2003 British television miniseries, also compiled as a film, starring Niamh Cusack
"State of Mind" (The Jeffersons), a television episode

Music
State of Mind (band), a New Zealand drum and bass duo
A State of Mind (band), an international hip hop group

Albums
State of Mind (Citizen Zero album), 2016
State of Mind (Commissioned album), 1990
State of Mind (Elegy album) or the title song, 1997
State of Mind (Front Line Assembly album), 1988
State of Mind (Holly Valance album) or the title song (see below), 2003
State of Mind (Hunter Brothers album), 2019
State of Mind (Psycho Motel album), 1995
State of Mind (Raul Midón album) or the title song, 2005
A State of Mind (album), by E.M.D., 2008
State of Mind (EP), by Dizzy Wright, or the title song, 2014
State of Mind EP, by Clockwork Radio, or the title song, 2010
State of Mind, by the Faim, 2019
State of Mind, by Kary Ng, 2014
State of Mind, by Wave, 2002

Songs
"State of Mind" (Clint Black song), 1993
"State of Mind" (Fish song), 1989
"State of Mind" (Holly Valance song), 2003
"State of Mind", by Electric Light Orchestra from Zoom, 2001
"State of Mind", by Jack Lucien from Everything I Want to Be, 2011
"State of Mind", by Mad Caddies from Keep It Going, 2007
"State of Mind", by Suzi Quatro from Rock Hard, 1981
"State of Mind", by Tkay Maidza from Tkay, 2016
"State of Mind", by Goldie from Timeless, 1995

Other uses
Mental state
State of Mind (video game), a 2018 graphic adventure game
Jefferson (proposed Pacific state), nicknamed State of Mind
States of Mind, a 1911 trilogy of paintings by Umberto Boccioni

See also
Altered state of consciousness
Frame of Mind (disambiguation)